The fictional HBO drama series The Wire focused largely on the Baltimore docks in its second season, introducing many new characters to the cast, which include the working Stevedores and their families as well as the criminal organization that controls smuggling through the Baltimore docks.

Sobotka family
The Sobotka family is a Polish American Baltimore family. The head of the family is Frank, a treasurer for the local union. The Sobotkas are hated by Southeastern District commander Stanislaus Valchek who has a long-standing feud with Frank.

Frank Sobotka

Frank Sobotka was a respected longshoremen's local union leader who became involved with an organized crime smuggling operation in order to finance a political campaign to sustain the docks.

Joan Sobotka
Played by: Elisabeth Noone
Appears in season 2: "Ebb Tide" and "Hard Cases".
Joan is Louis' wife and the two live with their grown son, Nick. Joan bemoans her family's drinking habits and tries to encourage Nick to get as much work as possible at the port. She refuses to make breakfast for him if he is not up in time for work. Nick often has his girlfriend Aimee to stay but hides her visits from his parents. Joan is aghast when the police serve warrants and search her home looking for Nick and find drugs and cash.

Louis Sobotka
Played by: Robert Hogan
Appears in season 2: "Hard Cases"; "Duck and Cover"; "Bad Dreams" and "Port in a Storm".
Louis is Frank Sobotka's elder brother and Nick's father. Louis was forced to retire early from his trade as a shipwright. He spends his days hypothetically gambling on horses (he never places any money on his bets) and drinking at Delores' bar. He refuses to get involved in the family's smuggling operation. When a warrant is put on Nick for his drug involvement Louis convinces him to turn himself in.

Nick Sobotka

Played by: Pablo Schreiber

Louis and Joan's son and Frank's nephew, Nick is a well-liked young stevedore with extensive family connections to the Baltimore port and links to the criminal underworld.

Ziggy Sobotka

Ziggy is Frank's son, an impulsive and often reckless young checker, loosely based on Pinkie Bannion, a real life docker in the Baltimore area, at the docks with a desire to prove himself and a respected father to live up to.

Dock workers
The dock workers are all members of the Baltimore Union of the International Brotherhood of Stevedores. They are also hated by Southeastern District commander Stan Valchek who views them as nothing more than dishonorable thieves stealing anything that comes into the port.

Nat Coxson
 Played by: Luray Cooper
 Appears in
Season 2: "Ebb Tide"; "Collateral Damage"; "Hot Shots"; "Undertow"; "All Prologue"; "Backwash"; "Stray Rounds"; "Storm Warnings"; and "Port in a Storm".
Season 5: "The Dickensian Aspect"
Nat is a bald-headed African-American stevedore who is a union president and is dubious of Frank Sobotka's political maneuvering. Nat is a firm believer that the unions should focus on repairing the disused grain pier before it is bought by property developers. He opposes Frank's efforts to have the canal dredged as he believes that this is a goal beyond their reach. Nat is concerned about Frank's surge in income and spending on campaign contributions and hiring a lobbyist. He questions Frank about the source of the funds and when Frank refuses to answer Nat cautions him about the risks of showing so much money.

Nat is an advocate for Ott in the forthcoming union election. He expects Frank to stand down to let Ott take his place as the unions have an arrangement that Polish and African American leaders will alternate. Frank asks Nat to allow him to continue for a second term to try to achieve his political goals and Nat is dubious. When Frank is murdered, Nat is horrified along with the other Stevedores. Nat's worst fears are ultimately realized when the grain pier is converted into condominiums.

Vernon "Ott" Motley
 Played by: Bus Howard
 Appears in season 2: "Ebb Tide"; "Collateral Damage"; "Duck and Cover"; "Stray Rounds" and "Port in a Storm".
Moustached older African-American stevedore often seen drinking in Delores' bar. Ott was arrested on a DWI charge as part of Major Valchek's vendetta against the union. He was released on bail later the same day. Frank's response was to have Horseface steal a surveillance van from Valchek's district parking lot; Ott helped to load the van into a container to be shipped around the country.

Ott was set to take over from Frank as treasurer when the next election came around, per the Stevedores' arrangement that the position swap between a Polish and African-American after each term. Ott was supported by his friend Nat Coxson, president of another local union. Ott realized that Frank planned to run again and was angry that he was not honoring the agreement. When Frank was murdered, Ott withdrew his candidacy as a show of unity against the federal government's attempt to break up the union.

Little Big Roy
 Played by: Richard Pelzman
 Appears in:
Season 2: "Ebb Tide"; "Backwash" (uncredited); "Duck and Cover"; "Bad Dreams" and "Port in a Storm" (uncredited).
Season 5: "The Dickensian Aspect"

Little Big Roy is a large, balding, Polish crew chief from Nat Coxson's IBS longshoremen's union. He is often seen drinking in Delores' bar with other union members. Frank Sobotka borrowed Little Big Roy's union card in order to work a ship to clear his head after he was arrested. When Frank's body was pulled out of the docks Little Big Roy was there to watch with the other devastated Stevedores. As well as that, he is well known for being very protective of his Union Card and is extremely cautious about who he gives it to.

Thomas "Horseface" Pakusa

 Played by: Charley Scalies
 Appears in season two: "Ebb Tide"; "Collateral Damage"; "Hot Shots"; "Hard Cases"; "Undertow"; "All Prologue"; "Backwash"; "Duck and Cover"; "Stray Rounds"; "Storm Warnings"; "Bad Dreams" and "Port in a Storm".
Checker from Frank Sobotka's union who assists him in moving contraband through the port. Horse was responsible for stealing Valchek's surveillance van in the union's feud with the police major. Horse was arrested and put on trial along with Eton Ben-Eleazer following the details investigation of smuggling through the Baltimore docks. The outcome of his trial is not shown, though Nick Sobotka testified that Horseface knew nothing of the smuggling.

Johnny "Fifty" Spamanto
 Played by: Jeffrey Pratt Gordon
 Appears in
Season 2: "Ebb Tide"; "Collateral Damage"; "Hot Shots"; "Hard Cases"; "Undertow"; "All Prologue"; "Backwash"; "Duck and Cover"; "Stray Rounds"; "Storm Warnings"; "Bad Dreams" and "Port in a Storm".
Season 5: "Transitions".
Johnny "Fifty" is a young checker from Frank Sobotka's union. Spamanto is Caucasian and wears a long beard. He received his nickname for drinking fifty-three beers on his 25th birthday and is often seen drinking in Delores' bar. Spamanto assists Nick and Ziggy in stealing from the docks for The Greek. He refuses to get involved in the drug trade with Nick and Ziggy. 

Spamanto was indicted by a grand jury as part of the investigation into smuggling at the docks but gave very little information and escaped uncharged.  Johnny Fifty briefly resurfaces in Season 5 as a homeless man, demonstrating how far the union has fallen: in previous years, Spamanto regularly found work in the tower, but is now evidently getting very few hours and as a result is hurting financially.

Big Roy
 Played by: Doug Lory
 Appears in season two: "Ebb Tide"; "Bad Dreams" and "Port in a Storm" (uncredited).
Big Roy is a ponytailed white stevedore who is much smaller than his colleague Little Big Roy. Big Roy was part of the crowd of Stevedores that witnessed their murdered union leader Frank Sobotka being pulled from the docks.

Chess
 Played by: J. Valenteen Gregg
 Appears in season two: "Ebb Tide"; "Duck and Cover"; "All Prologue" (uncredited) and "Port in a Storm" (uncredited).
Chess is a large, senior, African-American stevedore who is often seen drinking at Delores' bar. He questions Frank Sobotka about the source of his political capital at a union meeting.

La La
 Played by: Kelvin Davis
 Appears in season 2: "Ebb Tide" (uncredited); "Backwash"; "Duck and Cover"; "Stray Rounds" and "Port in a Storm".
Bald African-American stevedore from Frank Sobotka's union. La La has little seniority amongst union men and therefore struggles to find work. When Frank got into a feud with Southeastern police district commander Major Valchek, La La was arrested on a DWI stop when leaving Delores' bar along with several other union members. He is a friend of Nick Sobotka and accompanied him to try to talk a drug dealer called "Cheese" into giving back his friend and Nick's cousin Ziggy's car.

Maui
 Played by: Lance Irwin
 Appears in season 2: "Hard Cases"; "Undertow"; "Backwash"; "Duck and Cover" and "Port in a Storm".
Maui is a checker from Frank Sobotka's union who had a relationship with Officer Beadie Russell. Beadie reconnected with Maui to get information about smuggling from the docks; he refused to inform on his fellow union men but told her to check the port's computer system for information. Maui dislikes Ziggy Sobotka, playing various tricks on him, culminating with Maui humiliating Ziggy by forcing him on top of a container and stranding him there.

The Greeks

The Greeks are an international smuggling and organized crime organization with several Eastern European members in Baltimore operating out of a rundown cafe.

Others

Aimee
Played by: Kristin Proctor
Appears in season 2: "Hot Shots"; "Hard Cases"; "Undertow"; "Backwash"; "Storm Warnings"; "Bad Dreams" and "Port in a Storm".
Aimee is Nick Sobotka's girlfriend and the mother of his daughter, Ashley. Aimee could not stay overnight at Nick's home because he still lived with his parents. Aimee hopes to get a place for her young family to share and encourages Nick to go house hunting with her despite his lack of income from his dock work. 

She is shocked when she discovers a bundle of cash in his basement room, but he explains it by telling her that it comes from a new warehouse manager position. Aimee was at Nick's home when the police raided it and found a stash of heroin. She accepted his misdeeds and went into protective custody with him; the two finally sharing a home for a night.

Delores
Played by: Jill Redding
Appears in season 2: "Ebb Tide"; "Collateral Damage"; "Hot Shots"; "Hard Cases" and "Undertow."
Delores is the owner of the bar frequented by the Stevedores. She has a great respect for union leader Frank Sobotka and holds cash to be handed to workers in his union who are struggling for money on his behalf. She has an uneasy friendship with Ziggy Sobotka because he is constantly exposing his genitalia in her bar.

Bruce DiBiago
Played by: Keith Flippen
Appears in season 2: "Hot Shots"; "Backwash" and "Bad Dreams".
DiBiago is Frank Sobotka's lobbyist with heavy political contacts. His great-grandfather was a knife sharpener in Baltimore. His eldest son, Jason, attends Princeton University.

References

Lists of The Wire characters